The División de Fútbol Profesional is the top-flight professional football league in Bolivia. Until 2017 it was known as the "Liga de Fútbol Profesional Boliviano".

Since 1950, a total of 16 clubs have been crowned champions of the Bolivian football league system. The current champions are Bolívar, which won the title in the 2022 Apertura tournament. Bolívar is also the most successful club in the league, with 30 titles to date.

History 
The organisation of football in Bolivia started in 1914 with the creation of regional associations and their respective competitions. The "La Paz Football Association" (Asociación de Fútbol de La Paz – AFLP) was the first organised body with 29 championships held between 1914 and 1949. The AFLP was considered for many years the top football tournament in the country. In 1950 the body modified its statutes allowing the professionalisation of the sport in Bolivia, so the "Torneo Profesional" was created.

Between 1950 and 1959, only clubs from La Paz, Oruro (since 1954) and Cochabamba (1955) took part of the championship because football was still amateur in the rest of the regions.

At the end of 1960, the Bolivian Football Federation established a national championship, with the purpose of crowning a champion representing Bolivia in recently created Copa Libertadores. The competition, named "Copa Simón Bolívar", was contested by champions and runner ups of regional associations.

The demise of Bolivia national team in the 1978 FIFA World Cup qualification (where it was thrashed by Brazil 8–0 and Peru 5–0) encouraged some clubs to create their own league, so 16 teams separated from their respective associations to establish the "Liga de Fútbol Profesional Boliviano" (Bolivian Professional Football League – LFPB) to organise championships autonomously, in 1977.

The creation of the LFPB ended the distinction. It also resulted in the creation of three separate entities: the FBF's role was restricted to the international representation of Bolivia in the sport, the newly created LFPB became the organizer of the sole first division tournament, and the LPFA, together with the rest of the regional associations, became the organizer of the second (and lower) division regionalized tournaments. It was the first and, until the formation of the basketball league (LIBOBASQUET) in 2014, the only professional sports league in the country.

In 2017, after a change of statutes in the FBF, the LFPB and the ANF were replaced by the "División Profesional" (professional division) and the "División Aficionados" (amateur division), both managed by the FBF from 2018 onwards.

Format overview 
The championship format has changed over the years. Beginning in 1977, the league ran with sixteen clubs divided into two series, but switched to fourteen clubs in two series playing two tournaments each year beginning in the mid 80s and economical problems with some teams led to another cut in the number of participants to twelve in 1991. Another change came in 2005 when teams decided to adapt to the International FIFA calendar, meaning the season would be played from August to June rather than from February to December, in order to avoid problems defining which teams would qualify for international tournaments. The league played a short tournament from February to June in 2005, and the official 2005-06 season started in August. This led to yet another problem — second division teams weren't keen on the idea of putting off relegation until June 2006. After negotiations, the league determined that relegation of the lowest standing club would take place after the completion of the Apertura tournament, making the Bolivian league an odd tournament where teams were relegated in the middle of the season. But this decision was overturned in November 2006 and the league switched back to a calendar-year season in 2007 starting with the Apertura tournament in March 2007. For the 2018 season, the number of teams was increased from twelve to fourteen.

Historically, teams from La Paz, Cochabamba and Santa Cruz have dominated the league. Until 2007 only San José won the league in 1995, but since then teams from the "big three" have struggled to win the league again and 3 teams from smaller cities have won it (Real Potosí, San José and Universitario).

Three teams share the record of never been relegated to "La Simón Bolivar" (2nd division): The Strongest, Oriente Petrolero and Bolívar (although they were relegated in 1969 before the LPFB era).

For the 2008 season, and for the first time, three tournaments were played instead of the usual two. The Apertura tournament was played from March to July on a round-robin system; the Clausura tournament played from August to October where the teams were divided into two series of 6 teams each, Group A comprised all western teams (plus Universitario) and Group B comprised all eastern teams (plus Wilstermann and Aurora), the top two teams of each group advanced to the semifinals and the finals. The newly instated play-off tournament consisted of home-away matches (and with away goals rule used for the first time).

An average points from the previous two seasons determines relegation, with the last placed team being directly relegated and replaced by the winner of the Liga Nacional B. With the 11th placed team playing a promotion play-off with the runner-up of the Liga Nacional B.

Current teams (2023)

List of champions

Notes

Titles by club

References

External links
 
 RSSSF List of Champions
 RSSSF Topscorers

 
1
Top level football leagues of South America
Sports leagues established in 1977